Brighton 4th ( meotkhe Brait’oni) is a 2021 Georgian drama film directed by Levan Koguashvili. It was selected as the Georgian entry for the Best International Feature Film at the 94th Academy Awards.

Plot
A former Olympic wrestler from Tbilisi helps his adult son in Brighton Beach to get his life on track.

Cast
 Levan Tediashvili
 Giorgi Tabidze
 Kakhi Kavsadze
 Nadezhda Mikhalkova
 Irakli Kavsadze
 Tornike Bziava
 Anastasia Romashko

Reception

Critical response 
On Rotten Tomatoes, the film holds an approval rating of 89% based on 27 reviews, with an average rating of 7.5/10.

Awards
The film won best picture award at Asian World Film Festival 2021 in Los Angeles. At the Tribeca Film Festival 2021, it won three awards: best international film, best actor for Levan Tediashvili, and best screenplay for Boris Frumin. At FilmFestival Cottbus 2021, the film also won three awards:  Outstanding Individual Performance, for Levan Tediashvili; also the FIPRESCI Prize, and the Prize of the Ecumenical Jury.

See also
 List of submissions to the 94th Academy Awards for Best International Feature Film
 List of Georgian submissions for the Academy Award for Best International Feature Film

References

External links
 

2021 films
2021 drama films
Drama films from Georgia (country)
2020s Georgian-language films